René Bonora (born 21 January 1951) is a Cuban former footballer who competed in the 1976 Summer Olympics.

International career
Hailing from Camagüey Province, Bonora also represented his country in 5 FIFA World Cup qualification matches.

References

External links
 

1951 births
Living people
Cuban footballers
Cuba international footballers
Association football defenders
FC Camagüey players
Olympic footballers of Cuba
Footballers at the 1976 Summer Olympics
Pan American Games medalists in football
Pan American Games bronze medalists for Cuba
Footballers at the 1971 Pan American Games
People from Camagüey Province
Medalists at the 1971 Pan American Games